Échassières is a commune in the Allier department in central France.

Geography
The river Bouble forms most of the commune's northwestern border.

Population

See also
Communes of the Allier department
Echassières mine

External links 
 Town hall website (in French)

References

Communes of Allier
Allier communes articles needing translation from French Wikipedia